Béla Nagy (born 20 March 1962) is a Hungarian wrestler. He competed at the 1988 Summer Olympics and the 1992 Summer Olympics.

References

External links
 

1962 births
Living people
Hungarian male sport wrestlers
Olympic wrestlers of Hungary
Wrestlers at the 1988 Summer Olympics
Wrestlers at the 1992 Summer Olympics
People from Nádudvar
Sportspeople from Hajdú-Bihar County
20th-century Hungarian people